AACR  may refer to:

 Across a Crowded Room, an album by Richard Thompson released in 1985
 American Association for Cancer Research, an organization based in Philadelphia, Pennsylvania
 American Cable and Radio Corporation, a former communications holding company in the middle 20th century previously known as All America Cables and Radio
 Anglo-American Cataloguing Rules, a publication for library professionals
 Association for the Advancement of Civil Rights, a political party in Gibraltar
 Autoritatea Aeronautică Civilă Română ("Romanian Civil Aeronautical Authority")